Nii Okai (Ernest Nii-Okai Okai, born September 19, 1977) is a Ghanaian Contemporary gospel singer and a choir leader.

Early life and education
Nii Okai had his Secondary School education at Mfantsipim School in Cape Coast, Central Region of Ghana and furthered at the Kwame Nkrumah University of Science and Technology. He currently holds an MA in Mission and Theology.

Nii Okai in the mid 2010 set up "Nii Okai Ministries", a team of vagrant music missionaries based in Tema, Ghana.

Music career
Nii Okai is currently the leader of "Harbour City Mass Choir" (H.C.M.C.), an inter-denominational music ministry based in Tema, Ghana.
He came to limelight when he released his first album "Moko Be". An 8-track music album produced by one of the great multi-talented instrumentalists in Ghana, KODA with its hit songs; "Woana Na" and "Moko Be". The album featured "Danny Nettey", "Nana Yaa Amihere" among others.

Nii Okai and "The Harbour City Mass Choir"
Nii Okai is the co-founder of "Harbour City Mass Choir" an inter-denominational music ministry based in Tema, Ghana with a clear purpose of impacting the youth through contemporary gospel music, school outreach programs, music ministry workshops as well as peer and social counseling.

Nii Okai has 5 albums to his credit. "Moko Be", "Hymnz Unlimited", "Worshipful", "Saving Hearts" and "Holy writings" which he received an award with the "Saving Hearts" album at the 16th edition of Vodafone Ghana Music Awards for Music for Development Award.

Personal life
Nii is a professional banker and married to Yaa Okai. The couple have 3 children. He's a member of the "St. Paul's Methodist Church" in Tema.

Discography

Albums

Major Singles
 Woana na
 Moko be Produced by KODA

Awards and nominations

References

External links
 iTunes

Living people
21st-century Ghanaian male singers
21st-century Ghanaian singers
Ghanaian gospel singers
People from Tema
1977 births
Mfantsipim School alumni
Kwame Nkrumah University of Science and Technology alumni